The United States national professional ballroom dance champions are crowned at the United States Dance Championships (formerly USDSC, and USBC), as recognized by the National Dance Council of America (NDCA) and the World Dance & DanceSport Council (WD&DSC).

The American Rhythm division consists of American-style cha cha, rumba, East Coast swing, bolero, and mambo.

U.S. National Champions

See also 
U.S. National Dancesport Champions (Professional Standard)
U.S. National Dancesport Champions (Professional Latin)
U.S. National Dancesport Champions (Professional Smooth)
U.S. National Dancesport Champions (Professional 10-Dance)
U.S. National Dancesport Champions (Professional 9-Dance)
Dancesport World Champions (rhythm)

References

External links 
United States Dance Sport Championships (USDSC)
National Dance Council of America (NDCA)
Dancesport Competitions
Dancesport Info

Dancesport in the United States